McCoy is an unincorporated community in Polk County, Oregon, United States. It was named after the landowner Isaac McCoy. Its post office was established in 1879 with James A. Sears as the postmaster, and closed in 1968.

References

External links
Photos of McCoy from Melissa Whitney (2017)

Unincorporated communities in Polk County, Oregon
1879 establishments in Oregon
Populated places established in 1879
Unincorporated communities in Oregon